Dahaneh-ye Khargan (also Romanized as Dahaneh-ye Khārgān) is a village in Deh Kahan Rural District, Aseminun District, Manujan County, Kerman Province, Iran. At the 2006 census, its population was 23, in 4 families.

References 

Populated places in Manujan County